The Manfredonia accidental release of arsenic took place near the Italian town Manfredonia in September 1976 at the Enichem petrochemical plant, which produced fertilizers and caprolactam, a precursor in the manufacture of nylon.  A scrubbing tower for the synthesis of ammonia
gases blew up, releasing into the atmosphere several tons of potassium carbonate and bicarbonate solution containing arsenic trioxide. One hundred and fifty people were admitted to the local hospital for arsenic poisoning.

References

1976 health disasters
1976 industrial disasters
M
Accidental Release Arsenic 1976
Arsenic
1976 in Italy
September 1976 events in Europe
1976 disasters in Italy